The Waterloo Hawks were a minor league team that existed on-and-off from 1922 to 1969. From 1922 to 1932, they played in the Mississippi Valley League and in 1932 they were affiliated with the Chicago White Sox. They played in the Western League in 1936 and from 1940 to 1942 they played in the Illinois-Iowa-Indiana League and were affiliated again with the White Sox. From 1958 to 1969 they played in the Midwest League and were affiliated with the Boston Red Sox (1958–1968) and Kansas City Royals (1969). They were located in Waterloo, Iowa.

In 1936 and from 1940 to 1942, they played their home games at Red Hawk Stadium. From 1958 to 1969, they played their home games at Riverfront Stadium.

Year-by-year record

References

Baseball teams established in 1922
Baseball teams disestablished in 1942
Baseball teams established in 1958
Baseball teams disestablished in 1969
Defunct Midwest League teams
Defunct baseball teams in Iowa
Chicago White Sox minor league affiliates 
Boston Red Sox minor league affiliates 
Kansas City Royals minor league affiliates
1922 establishments in Iowa
1942 disestablishments in Iowa
1958 establishments in Iowa
1969 disestablishments in Iowa
Defunct Western League teams
Mississippi Valley League teams